Utopian studies is an interdisciplinary field of study that researches utopianism in all its forms, including utopian politics, utopian literature and art, utopian theory, and intentional communities. The term utopia was created by Sir Thomas More in a book with the same name in 1516. Utopian studies can be subdivided into three major parts: study of utopian works, communitarianism and utopian social theory.

History

Denis Vairasse is mentioned among the earliest scholars in this field. His History of the Sevarambians contains one of the first thoughts on theoretical reflection on the concept of utopia: "Those who have read Plato’s Republic or the Utopia of Thomas More or Chancellor Bacon’s New Atlantis, which are in fact nothing more than the ingenious inventions [“imaginations”] of these authors, may think perhaps that this account of newly discovered countries, with all their marvels, is of a similar type [“sont de ce genre”]."

After the Summer of Love in 1960s, there was a significant increase in utopian works. The Society for Utopian Studies was founded in 1975 and the Utopian Studies Society was founded in 1988.

Significant utopian studies scholars (in roughly chronological order)
 Herbert Marcuse
 Karl Mannheim
 Ernst Bloch
 Krishnan Kumar
 Raymond Williams
 Darko Suvin
 Lyman Tower Sargent
 Gregory Claeys
 Ruth Levitas
 Tom Moylan
 Fredric Jameson
 Lucy Sargisson
 Vincent Geoghegan
 Raffaella Baccolini

Principal research institutions, journals, conferences, societies, awards
Research institutions:

Societies:
 Society for Utopian Studies (North America, founded 1975)
 Utopian Studies Society  (Europe, founded 1988)

Journals:
 Utopian Studies (founded 1987)

Conferences:
 Society for Utopian Studies, annual 
 Utopian Studies Society, annual 

Awards:
The Lyman Tower Sargent Distinguished Scholar Award, made by the Society for Utopian Studies.

Significant works

References

External links
Society for Utopian Studies
Utopian Studies Society
Utopian Studies journal

Idealism
Utopian studies